is a town located in Aira District, Kagoshima Prefecture, Japan.

As of September 1, 2011, the town has an estimated population of 11,420 and the density of 79.1 persons per km². The total area is 144.33 km².

The town was founded on March 22, 2005 from the merger of the towns of Kurino and Yoshimatsu, both from Aira District.

"Yūsui" literally means "spring water", referring to springs in the town.

Geography
 Kirishima-Yaku National Park

Culture
 Kirishima Open Air Museum

Transportation
 Kurino Station
 Tsurumaru Station
 Yoshimatsu Station

References

External links

Yūsui official website 

 
Towns in Kagoshima Prefecture